Le Halua Le is a 2012 Indian Bengali-language comedy film directed by Raja Chanda, starring Mithun Chakraborty. The film is the remake of successful  film Hungama and 
Poochakkoru Mookkuthi directed by Priyadarshan.

Cast
 
 Mithun Chakraborty as Harshabardhan Banerjee
 Soham Chakraborty as Rahul
 Hiran as Suvojeet/Suvo
 Payel Sarkar as Sonali
 Aritra Dutta Banik as Dipu
 Kharaj Mukherjee as Gobindo
 Kanchan Mullick as Langcha
 Subhasish Mukherjee as Madhusudan, Harshabardhan's servant
 Laboni Sarkar as Sonali Banerjee, Harshabardhan's wife
 Kamalika Banerjee as Rahul's mother
 Rajat Ganguly as Rahul's father
 Sumit Ganguly as Goon
 Shantilal Mukherjee as Police Inspector
 Locket Chatterjee as Gobindo's wife
 Rajatava Dutta as Sona Da MLA

Soundtrack

External links

References

2012 films
Indian comedy films
Bengali remakes of Malayalam films
Films scored by Jeet Ganguly
Bengali-language Indian films
2010s Bengali-language films
Films directed by Raja Chanda